Fulranumab is a monoclonal antibody against nerve growth factor. It was designed for the treatment of pain.

Johnson & Johnson licensed the drug from Amgen in a deal valued at around US$425 million in 2008. In 2016 Johnson & Johnson discontinued all phase III trials of fulranumab and returned the rights to its originator. The company said the decision was based on "strategic portfolio prioritisation and was not based on any emerging safety concerns from the phase III clinical studies with fulranumab" in osteoarthritic pain.

See also
 List of investigational analgesics

References 

Amgen